The Orvanne is a  long river in northern France located in the departments of Yonne (Bourgogne-Franche-Comté) and Seine-et-Marne (Île-de-France). It is a tributary of the river Loing on the right side, and so is a sub-tributary of the Seine. Its source is in the commune of Saint-Valérien, and it flows into the Loing in Moret-sur-Loing. The largest towns on the Orvanne are Voulx and Moret-Loing-et-Orvanne.

References

Rivers of France
Rivers of Yonne
Rivers of Seine-et-Marne
Rivers of Bourgogne-Franche-Comté
Rivers of Île-de-France